Welcome to Galvania is the fifth studio album by American rock band Puddle of Mudd. This is their first studio album of new material in a decade since 2009's Volume 4: Songs in the Key of Love & Hate, marking the longest gap between two studio albums in Puddle of Mudd's career. It is also their first release of any new material since 2011's re:(disc)overed, a compilation album of covers. Welcome to Galvania was released worldwide September 13, 2019.

Loudwire named it one of the 50 best rock albums of 2019.

Background and release

After the group finished touring in support for their 2011 compilation album re:(disc)overed, over the course of the next few years lead singer Wes Scantlin had multiple run-ins with the law and multiple arrests. These strings of bad behavior occurred during many shows too, some where Wes would not show at all or was too intoxicated to perform.

On September 21, 2014 the band released a new single titled "Piece of the Action" to digital outlets though the track had no official announcement from the band and zero support from them or any label.

On July 17, 2015 it was announced via Loudwire that the band was recording tracks for a new album at Grandmasters Studio with producer Cameron Webb.

From 2015-2017 the legal troubles and on stage meltdowns continued for Scantlin, in one instance leading the entire band to walk out on him.

In January 2018 the band finally revealed lead singer Wes Scantlin had been in rehab for some months and was reportedly doing well and the band would resume touring once he was 100% level headed.

In August 2018, it was announced that Wes was 6 months sober and that Puddle of Mudd would be headlining "The Resurrection Tour" featuring bands Tantric and Saliva.

It was reported via Blabbermouth.net in December 2018 that Puddle of Mudd would return with a "kick Badass" new album in 2019.

On July 12, 2019 it was announced the new album would be called "Welcome to Galvania" and that the lead single titled "Uh Oh" was available for purchase.

Track listing

Personnel

Puddle of Mudd
Wes Scantlin - lead vocals, guitar
Matt Fuller - lead guitar, backing vocals
Michael John Adams - bass guitar, backing vocals
Dave Moreno - drums, backing vocals

References

Puddle of Mudd albums
2019 albums